Muhannad Naim (born 28 January 1993) is a Qatari-Palestinian footballer who plays as a goalkeeper. He also currently plays for the Qatar U-21 national team as their first choice goalkeeper, and he also plays for the Qatar Olympic (U-23) team.

Career
Muhannad Naim first started playing football at the age of eight. He played in Al Khor's youth team as a teenager, but later joined Al Sadd's senior team in 2009 in what was supposed to be a temporary loan.

He participated in the ASPIRE U-19 tournament held in Doha in April 2012. Qatar won the tournament, only conceding a single goal, resulting in Naim winning the "Best Goalkeeper of the Tournament" award.

In January 2013, he had undergone a training period in German club Schalke 04 in the interim of their training camp being held in Doha. Additionally, he played in a friendly for Al Sadd against Schalke, narrowly losing 2–3. Later that month, he was sent on loan to ASPIRE-owned Belgian 2nd Division club Eupen until the end of the season. He made 2 appearances for the club before returning to Al Sadd.

Personal life
Naim was born in Saudi Arabia to Palestinian parents, and moved to Qatar at a young age. He is a youth international for Qatar.

External links
 QATAR STARS LEAGUE - QSL.com.qa

References

1993 births
Living people
Qatari footballers
Qatar youth international footballers
Palestinian emigrants to Qatar
Qatari people of Palestinian descent
Naturalised citizens of Qatar
Al-Khor SC players
Al Sadd SC players
Al-Arabi SC (Qatar) players
Al Kharaitiyat SC players
Umm Salal SC players
Muaither SC players
Qatari expatriate footballers
Qatar Stars League players
Qatari Second Division players
Challenger Pro League players
K.A.S. Eupen players
Expatriate footballers in Belgium
Qatari expatriate sportspeople in Belgium
Footballers at the 2010 Asian Games
Association football goalkeepers
Asian Games competitors for Qatar